Praslin Island Airport  also known as Iles des Palmes Airport, is an airport at Grand Anse on Praslin Island in the Seychelles. It is served by Air Seychelles, which flies scheduled flights to Mahé and charters to the other islands in the Seychelles. The airport has the capacity to handle over 1500 passengers daily and over half a million passengers annually.

History
During the late 1990s Praslin underwent an expansion to deal with increased passengers and larger planes. The airport was officially reopened on June 3, 2001. The cost of the renovation was around 40 million Seychellois rupees.

Airline and destination

Statistics
Values from "Seychelles in Figures" for traffic between Mahé and Praslin:

See also
Transport in Seychelles
List of airports in Seychelles

References

External links
OurAirports - Praslin
FallingRain - Praslin Airport

Airports in Seychelles
Grand'Anse Praslin